Nellie Bowles is an American journalist. She is noted for covering the technology world of Silicon Valley. She worked as a journalist for the English-language Argentine daily the Buenos Aires Herald, the San Francisco Chronicle, The California Sunday Magazine, the technology journalism website Recode, the British daily The Guardian beginning in 2016, then for Vice News and most recently The New York Times.

Career 
From 2017 to 2021, Bowles covered technology for the New York Times in the San Francisco Bay Area. In 2020, she was awarded the prestigious Robert F. Kennedy Journalism Award and the Gerald Loeb Award for investigative reporting along with two colleagues for her investigation into online child abuse; according to editor Dean Murphy, their "deep, persistent and compassionate reporting" served to "hold both government and big tech accountable, and tell the stories of untold children who have endured this abuse in silence." She covers the technology and business world of hi-tech startups and venture capital, and she has written about personalities such as Elon Musk, Eric Schmidt, and iHeartMedia CEO Bob Pittman. She covered the exclusive conference of technology CEOs called Further Future, and has written about subjects such as doxxing and cryptocurrencies. She appeared twice on the Charlie Rose nationally broadcast television interview show. 

Her reporting is often controversial; for example, her account of her interview with Jordan Peterson attracted much attention. She has moderated televised discussions on the subject of free speech in the digital age, and she has written about gender equality in the tech world. Her reports regarding the conflict between Israelis and Palestinians have sometimes generated additional controversy.

In 2021, Bowles along with Bari Weiss launched Common Sense on Substack. The publication changed names to The Free Press in 2022.

Personal life 
Bowles is a descendant of Henry Miller, who was dubbed the "Cattle King of California" and was at one point one of the largest land-owners in the United States, and a descendant of Thomas Crowley, who founded the transportation and logistics company Crowley Maritime. Bowles graduated from Columbia University in 2010. She is married to political commentator Bari Weiss, a relationship she says led her to convert to Judaism. She also says the conversion was part of a personal drive to be more empathy-driven in her reporting. They have a daughter, born in 2022.

Filmography
Vice News Tonight on HBO

Selected bibliography
"Video Games and Online Chats Are 'Hunting Grounds' for Sexual Predators", The New York Times, December 7, 2019,  part 3 of the "Exploited" series that won a Robert F. Kennedy Journalism Award and a Gerald Loeb Award

References

External links 
 Nellie Bowles profile at Muck Rack
 Interview Bowles interviews Eric Swalwell on Inforum
 Nellie Bowles and Jessica Lessin on Obligations in Tech YouTube video

Living people
Journalists from California
Columbia College (New York) alumni
People from San Francisco
American women journalists
The New York Times people
Year of birth missing (living people)
American LGBT writers
21st-century American journalists
Gerald Loeb Award winners for Investigative
21st-century American women writers
Place of birth missing (living people)
Converts to Judaism
LGBT Jews